Stewart Peak, elevation , is a summit in Colorado. The peak is the second highest thirteener (a peak between 13,000 and 13,999 feet in elevation) in the state.  It is located in the La Garita Mountains, sub-range of the San Juan Mountains, in Saguache County, within the La Garita Wilderness.  Stewart Peak is the 55th highest peak in Colorado by most standard definitions, just missing the list of Colorado fourteeners.  At one time, the peak's elevation was measured to be over 14,000 ft and it was believed to be a fourteener, but more recent and accurate surveys have dropped it below that threshold.

History
The first recorded ascent was on September 23, 1879, by the surveying party of Emmanuel Lee Patrick on behalf of the U.S. government. Stewart Peak and Stewart creek were both named after the first family to settle in the area. The peak was named in honor of William Mathews Stewart II.

See also

List of Colorado mountain ranges
List of Colorado mountain summits
List of Colorado fourteeners
List of Colorado 4000 meter prominent summits
List of the most prominent summits of Colorado
List of Colorado county high points

References

Further reading

External links

San Juan Mountains (Colorado)
Mountains of Saguache County, Colorado
North American 4000 m summits
Rio Grande National Forest
Mountains of Colorado